Steiner may refer to:

Surname
Steiner (surname)

Other uses
Steiner, Michigan, a village in the United States
Steiner, Mississippi
Steiner Studios, film and television production studio in New York City
Steiner's theorem, used to determine the mass moment of inertia around an axis. Also known as parallel axis theorem

See also
Poncelet–Steiner theorem
Steiner point (disambiguation)
Steiner surface
Steiner system, a type of block design
Steiner tree
Waldorf education, also called Steiner education
The Steiner Brothers, the professional wrestling "tag team" of real-life brothers Rick and Scott Steiner